Malcolm John Price (born 8 December 1937) is a Welsh dual-code international rugby union and professional rugby league footballer who played in the 1950s and 1960s.

Background
Malcolm Price was born in Pontypool, Wales.

International honours
Malcolm Price won nine caps for Wales (RU) between 1959 and 1962 and five caps in 1959 for British and Irish Lions while at Pontypool RFC. He also won caps for Great Britain (RL) while at Rochdale Hornets in 1967 against Australia (2 matches).

References

External links
!Great Britain Statistics at englandrl.co.uk (statistics currently missing due to not having appeared for both Great Britain, and England)
Statistics at scrum.com (RU)
Statistics at orl-heritagetrust.org.uk

1937 births
Living people
British & Irish Lions rugby union players from Wales
Dual-code rugby internationals
Great Britain national rugby league team players
Oldham R.L.F.C. players
Pontypool RFC players
Rochdale Hornets players
Rugby league centres
Rugby league players from Pontypool
Rugby union centres
Rugby union players from Pontypool
Salford Red Devils players
Wales international rugby union players
Welsh rugby league players
Welsh rugby union players